Honky Tonk Sonatas is the fourth album by Canadian country music singer Jason McCoy.

Track listing
 "I've Got a Weakness" (Casey Beathard, Michael Heeney) – 4:26
 "Kind of Like It's Love" (Jim Lauderdale, John Leventhal) – 3:00
 "Whisper" (Lauderdale) – 3:19
 "Ten Million Teardrops" (Jason McCoy, Tim Taylor) – 3:14
 "I Would for You" (Jay Knowles, Wynn Varble, Shawn Camp) – 3:11
 "My Love Will Follow You" (Buddy Miller, Julie Miller) – 3:08
 "Bury My Heart" (Tia Sillers, Mark Selby, Sean Michaels) – 2:58
 "Fix Anything" (McCoy, Denny Carr) – 4:08
 "Broke Down" (McCoy, Odie Blackmon) – 3:41
 "Doin' Time in Bakersfield" (Lauderdale, Frank Dycus) – 3:18
duet with Gary Allan
 "Don't Look Away" (James McGehee, Sean Michaels) – 4:48

Chart performance

Year-end charts

References

External links
 amazon.ca

Jason McCoy albums
2000 albums
Universal Records albums